Bdellouridae is a family of Maricola triclads.

Taxonomy
List of known genera:
Family Bdellouridae
Subfamily Bdellourinae
Nerpa
Pentacoelum
Syncoelidium
Bdelloura
Subfamily Palombiellinae
Palombiella
Miava
Synsiphonium

References

Maricola